Mota  is an Oceanic language spoken by about 750 people on Mota island, in the Banks Islands of Vanuatu. The language (named after the island) is one of the most conservative Torres–Banks languages, and the only one to keep its inherited five-vowel system intact while also preserving most final vowels.

History
During the period 1840-1940, Mota was used as a missionary lingua franca throughout areas of Oceania included in the Melanesian Mission, an Anglican missionary agency. Mota was used on Norfolk Island, in religious education; on other islands with different vernacular languages, it served as the language of liturgical prayers, hymns, and some other religious purposes. Elizabeth Fairburn Colenso translated religious material into the language.

Robert Henry Codrington compiled the first dictionary of Mota (1896), and worked with George Sarawia and others to produce a large number of early publications in this language.

Phonology

Phoneme inventory
Mota phonemically contrasts 14 consonants and 5 vowels, /i e a o u/. These 19 phonemes form the smallest phonemic inventory among the Torres-Banks languages.

Phonotactics
Proto-Torres–Banks, the ancestor of all Torres–Banks languages including Mota, is reconstructed as a language with open syllables of type {CV}, and no closed syllable {CVC}. That phonotactic profile has been preserved in many words of modern Mota (e.g. salagoro  “secret enclosure for initiation rituals”, ran̄oran̄o  “Acalypha hispida”), unlike surrounding languages which massively created closed syllables. That said, modern Mota also reflects the regular loss of unstressed high vowels *i and *u ‒ a process already incipient in the earliest attestations of the language (circa 1860) and completed in modern Mota. As a result, many modern Mota words now feature final consonants and/or consonant clusters: e.g. pal  (< palu) "to steal"; snaga  (< sinaga) "vegetable food"; ptepte  (< putepute) "to sit".

Literature
The New Testament was translated by Robert Henry Codrington, John Palmer, John Coleridge Patteson and L. Pritt all of the Melanesian Mission. The Bible was published in 1912 and then revised in 1928. The New Testament (O Vatavata we Garaqa) was further revised by W.G. Ivens of the Anglican Melanesian Mission and published in 1931 by the British and Foreign Bible Society (BFBS).
The Anglican Prayer Book was produced in Mota in 1947.

Notes

References

External links
 Portions of the Book of Common Prayer in Mota
 Texts in Mota from Project Canterbury
 Audio recordings in the Mota language, in open access, by A. François (source: Pangloss Collection of CNRS).
 Materials on Mota are included in the open access Arthur Capell collections (AC1 and AC2) held by Paradisec.
  Mota New Testament is on YouVersion.

Languages of Vanuatu
Banks–Torres languages
Torba Province